Rezzato is a comune in the province of Brescia, in Lombardy. It is bounded by the comunes of Brescia, Botticino, Castenedolo, Mazzano and Nuvolera.

Thanks to its nearness to the small town of Botticino, Rezzato is commonly considered the town of the marble working. The stonecutters from Rezzato have been famous since the 15th century for their creativity and their artistic way of working with Botticino marble.

Rezzato was chosen by the Commonwealth War Graves Commission as the place in which produce some of the headstones for its military cemeteries.

History

Ancient era
The most important place of prehistory in Rezzato was Ca' dei Grii, a cave on the south side of Monte Regogna. During some researches done from 1954 to 1968, were discovered some objects of the Neolithic period, the oldest of the area. Probably the cave was a refuge for some prehistoric men or for some families during the Second World War. It was destroyed in 1969 by an adjacent marble's pit.

Modern era

The origin of this town name is thought to be the medieval "Regadium", which meant "royal court", a term used to designate the area surrounding the city of Brescia. Benedictine monks contributed to the founding of Rezzato by draining the land and digging irrigation canals on the Valverde plain.

Rezzato became a free comune on 12 March 1299, when the inhabitants obtained by the bishop of Brescia Berardo Maggi the permission to autonomize the village from the Benedictine monastery of St. Eufemia.

In the 14th century, battles between Guelph and Ghibelline city-states led to domination over Milan and the nearby territory by the powerful Visconti family, backed by the emperor Henry VII. While the western part of Lombardy was taken over by the Sforza family in the 15th century, Brescia became part of the Venetian Republic in 1429. Under Venice, local commerce and crafts prospered, and Rezzato became known for its marble. Stone cutting was the predominant business in Rezzato from the 15th to the early 20th century.

Because of its nearness to the city and its particular climate, many noble families built their holiday houses in Rezzato. The noble Giacomo Chizzola, after the withdrawal by politics, founded in his villa a school for the children of the rich families in Brescia, so that they could learn Latin. It is known that the mathematician Niccolò Tartaglia gave a lesson in Euclide, and Chizzola taught rural economy. This academy was maybe the most ancient agricultural academy in the world.

Some notable person visited and stayed in Rezzato during the 19th century: Napoleone and Garibaldi spent a night in Villa Fenaroli, while the Prime Minister Giuseppe Zanardelli used to come to Rezzato in summer to spend his holidays.

On 15 June 1859, in Rezzato took place the notable "Battle of Treponti", one of the battles of the Second War of Independence, fought between Garibaldi and the Austrians.

The municipal territory took on its current dimensions in 1928, with the addition of the village of Virle Treponti.

Geography

Topography

Rezzato is located in the northern section of the Po Valley, immediately east of Brescia, at the foot of the Brescian Prealps.

The territory consists of three large morphological macroregions: the flat bight between Monte Maddalena, the hills of Botticino and the Monte Regogna. The hilly system consists of the mountains Regogna, Fieno (the highest point of the town's territory at ) and Marguzzo, and two hills called Peladolo and Poggio San Martino. While the northern part of the territory is hilly, the southern area of the town is flat.

The hills of the entire area are made up by different types of stones. The first one to be considered is the "corna" consisting of calcium carbonate and magnesium, which would have formed almost 193 million years ago. This stone is present throughout the basin between Monte Regogna and Monte Marguzzo, including Poggio San Martino. Important studies carried out on Mount Regogna allowed to identify various fossilized forms of marine life and marine life. The age of the "corso" begins shortly after the corna one. This stone is in the lower part of Monte Regogna. Since they are very low parts, a time so submerged in the sea, fossil shells of ammonite and sea urchins have been found here. The "medolo", which rises on the west side of Monte Regogna, has a much newer formation (178 million years ago) and is a stone made up of limestone marbles. The medolo is characteristic of a deep marine environment and therefore even here rivers of fossil shells emerge.

At just  from the Garda Lake, it is crossed by the so-called Naviglio Grande Bresciano, an ancient canal built in 1253, from which departs a huge system of small canals now mostly covered and still today used for agriculture. Other important canals are the Rino, a torrent that coming from the mountains crosses the historic center of Virle Treponti and enters the Naviglio Grande at the highway of Treponti. Near the mouth of the Rino, from the waters of the Naviglio the canal Lupa flows through the countryside south of Treponti towards Castenedolo. From Botticino descends the torrent Rino Musia that crosses part of the northeast wooded area of the town and then enters the city of Brescia.

Climate
According to the Köppen climate classification, Rezzato has a humid subtropical climate (Cfa).

Winter is cold but snowfall is rare; it mainly occurs from December through February. Summer can be sultry, when humidity levels are high and peak temperatures can reach .

The relative humidity is high throughout the year, especially in winter when it causes fog, mainly from dusk until late morning, although the phenomenon has become increasingly less frequent in recent years.

Precipitation is spread evenly throughout the year. The driest month is December, while the wettest months are April/May and October/November.

Demographics

Rezzato had a population of 13,576 inhabitants as of 31 December 2017.

Since the end of World War II, like others places in Lombardy, Rezzato has been host to two waves of mass migration: the first, workers from within Italy; the second, immigrants from outside the peninsula. These two migrations have corresponded with two different economic phases. The first migration coincided with the economic miracle of the 1950s and 1960s, a period of extraordinary growth based on classic industry and public works. The second immigration has taken place against the background of a vastly different economy, centred around services, small industry and post-industrial scenarios. The first migration concerned Italians, from the countryside, the mountains and the cities and towns of the South, the East or the other provinces of Lombardy.

Municipal government
The  is chaired by the mayor, who appoints others members, called .

From 1945 to 1995, the municipal government of Rezzato was under the control of the historical Christian Democracy (DC). Since 1995, the directly elected mayors of Rezzato has been all members of a center-left party.

The current mayor is Davide Giacomini (PD), elected on 26 May 2014 with the 52.8% of the votes.

This is a list of the mayors of Rezzato since 1945:

* Dead in office.

Main sights

PInAC, or Aldo Cibaldi International Gallery of Children's Art, opened officially in 1969 and it's the most important museum of the town. Today it holds more than 6,000 works of art in its facility in via Disciplina, the old deconsecrated church of St. Alexander. The building is both a gallery and an open educational centre, with training course and experimental didactic activities. Drawings by children are still being collected, studied and catalogued today. The gallery works with schools that are interested in promoting children's art and the child's view of the world. The gallery's collections are characterised by a multi-ethnic quality. Workshops for adults are organised with nationally and internationally known artists.
Villa Avogadro-Fenaroli: this spectacular setting lies between the villages of Ponte and Canale was home to the noble Avogadros and Fenarolis from Brescia for four centuries. Its north wing dates to the 16th century as well as the balcony overlooking today's Scalabrini Street. A 16th-century's lodge lies under cedars of Lebanon near the gardens' boundaries. Gothic greenhouses were built in 1840, while gardens were rearranged in 1863. The villa is since 2006 a Palace Hotel.
Bacchus' Temple: It's a small temple built by the Fenarolis in their private park on the top of the St. Peter's Hill during the 18th century, closing scenic stairs behind the Villa. In 2001, thieves deprived the temple of its pillars, leaving its dome and trabeation on the ground. The Municipality of Rezzato had it quickly repaired, recovering a symbol of the town's identity and history.
Rodolfo Vantini School: a reason for the success of Brescian neoclassicism is certainly the use of the white Botticino's stone. However, very highly skilled carpenters and chisellers were necessary to a style leaning on perfection. This is how Rodolfo Vantini had the idea to set up a school in Rezzato to train these workers. The school opened in 1839 in the Town Hall. Now the school is in the south of the town in a modern building. Vantini was also one of the best architects in Brescia.

Churches and religious sites

Shrine of Our Lady of Valverde

The shrine was built in a large wooded area in the northern part of the town (the so-called "Valverde", which means "green valley"). A small chapel called Rotonda was built here in 1099, and it is the most ancient sign of the religious faith of the entire zone. The shrine itself was only built between 1601 and 1643, after the archbishop of Milan Carlo Borromeo visited the town and ordered a big church to be built on a rural site in which there were a lot of abandoned and ruined altars built chaotically during the 15th century.

The site is one of the most important in the entire province because of the so-called "miracle of Valverde", a simultaneous apparition of the Virgin Mary and Christ which allegedly took place in the summer of 1399. Some chronicles tell that a peasant was working in his field when suddenly he saw a man dressed in red, who he recognised as Christ. The man told the peasant to throw the three pieces of bread that he had in his haversack in a little pond nearby. When he arrived at the pond, the peasant saw a lady, the Virgin Mary, who stopped him and ordered him to go back to Christ without throwing the bread into the pond. The peasant went back to Christ and then came back another time to the pond, where the Virgin told him that the three pieces of bread represented war, famine and plague. By throwing only one piece (symbolising plague) into the pond, the Virgin Mary interceded to save the village from war and famine.
According to the chronicles, another apparition occurred on 11 October 1711, when two boys who were picking chestnuts in the nearby wood suddenly saw a great light coming from the pond and a female voice calling them.

To remember the 1399 apparition every year on the last Sunday of July, there is a historical procession of saints from the town centre to the shrine and then to the holy pond where a man disguised as a peasant dives into the water to recover one of the pieces of holy bread.

St. James church

With the shrine of Our Lady of Valverde it's the most important symbol of the medieval religious faith in Rezzato. The small church was built in 1122 in the middle of the countryside, in the southern part of the town. Placed on the way to Rome, it worked as an inn for pilgrims who were attacked by a community of robbers, settled in the nearby town of Castenedolo. Because of the frequent looting, in 1132 pope Innocent XII ordered the excommunication of those who desecrated the church and its inn.

During the 15th century, a big cascina a corte was built around the church. Until the 1960s more than 300 people lived here and every Sunday a priest came from the town to celebrate a mass.

St. Peter Franciscan monastery
Built by the Benedictine monks in 1008 on the ruins of a Roman villa at the top of the St. Peter's Hill, it served as the main parish of Rezzato until 1460. In that period it became a Capuchin monastery. Closed by the French in 1798, reopened in 1836 and then reclosed in 1866 by the Italian government, the monastery was definitely reopened by the Franciscan friars in 1869 and also used as a prison during the First World War. It hosts an ancient library.

Transportation

The A4 motorway (Turin-Milan-Venice-Trieste) passes south of the town, while Route SS 11, the Padana Superiore road, and Route SS 45bis, the Gardesana Occidentale road, lead directly to Rezzato.

The nearest train station to Rezzato is in Brescia (the train station of Rezzato was active until mid-1990s), on the Milan-Venice railway line. The nearest airport is in Montichiari (8 km).

The town was connected to Brescia, Salò and Lake Garda by a by a tramway from 1887 to 1954 and by a train line from 1897 to 1967.

In the town there are about 7 km of cycling paths. Rezzato is also connected to the Lake Garda by the Rezzato-Vobarno cycling route.

In the second half of 2017, due to the impossibility of an extension of the Brescia Metro to the town, the possibility of a reopening of the local train station is under consideration.

Education and services
In Rezzato there are: 
 one public nursery school; 
 four public pre-education schools;
 three public elementary schools;
 one public lower secondary school.

The town is also provided with a vocational institute, hosted in the ancient "Rodolfo Vantini" School (School of Arts and Professional Instruction), which offers also a course in marble sculpture.

The central public library of Rezzato is the biggest of the eastern area of the Province and it's the center of a system of 22 libraries seated in different municipalities.

Since 1965, the town has a public retirement home and since 1975 there's a public building on the Monte Regogna used for daily summer camps for children and old people.

Environment

Recycling
Since December 2009, the municipality of Rezzato has adopted a kerbside collection system for removing household waste (materials separately collected are: green waste, kitchen waste, paper, plastics, aluminium and glass, diapers, industrial products). The adoption of this new system improved the percentage of recycled waste on total municipal waste production:

Sister cities

Rezzato is twinned with:
  Bogoroditsk, Tula Oblast, Russia (since 26 October 2007).

Gallery

References

External links
 Strada del vino "Colli dei Longobardi" route

Cities and towns in Lombardy